Archuleta v. Hedrick, 365 F.3d 644 (8th Cir. 2004) was a pro se petition for a writ of habeas corpus filed in the U.S. Court of Appeals for the Eighth Circuit in October 2002, appealing the dismissal of a case  brought by  defendant Benjamin Archuleta. Archuleta  had been found not guilty by reason of insanity of assault and subsequently ordered to be confined in a prison mental hospital by the United States District Court for the Western District of Missouri  after   his  successful insanity defense, as he was   evaluated by a psychiatrist as dangerous. His appeal challenged this confinement and "forced treatment", requested a withdrawal of his original insanity defense, and sought his unconditional release from custody.

The appellate court reversed the lower court's dismissal of the habeas corpus petition, saying that habeas corpus is a last resort remedy available to those without any other, and the case was remanded back to that court with the instructions to transfer the petition to another district court, the United States District Court for the District of Utah.

Facts of case
Benjamin Archuleta was charged with assaulting a federal official and found not guilty by reason of insanity (NGRI)  in the United States District Court for the District of Utah on July 23, 1999. Based on a  psychiatric evaluation and the testimony of others, the court ruled that Archuleta's release posed a substantial risk of harm to others and ordered him committed to the United States Medical Center for Federal Prisoners in Springfield, Missouri. Although later Archuleta was conditionally released,  his release was revoked on July 8, 2002 and he was recommitted to FMC Springfield until the time he was determined to be eligible for a conditional release by the hospital; such  release would be under court supervision.

Archuleta filed a pro se petition (a petition to represent himself) for habeas corpus relief (seeking relief for unlawful detention) in the U.S. Court of Appeals for the Western District of Missouri in October, 2002 requesting an  unconditional discharge and  release from confinement in the prison hospital.  He argued that the statute  under which  he was committed is unconstitutional because only a judicial unit, not an administrative one, can determine the length and conditions of his sentence and also whether his confinement after his successful NGRI  defense could exceed the sentence he would have received if found guilty under the law.    He further argued  that his confinement in the prison facility far from the court was equal to "banishment and exile" and that "forced treatment" violated the Eighth Amendment. He also contested the finding that he had violated the terms of his conditional release, saying that he did not refuse the forced treatment "but for the exception of being late on taking his [anti-psychotic] medication... one day". He also requested to withdraw his insanity defense.

At the district court level, the counsel for both parties agreed to  court’s interpretation of the pro se petition to focus on the issue of the involuntary administration of psychiatric medication.

Decision
The appellate court ruled that although Archuleta's post-acquittal confinement was constitutional under statute 18 U.S.C. § 4243,  it  decided to  consider the  unlawful detention question broadly  as "substantial public interests are involved", as habeas corpus is a remedy  available when no other is available. It ruled the lower court erred in overlooking the seriousness of the grievance, as  the statute under which Archuleta was committed for involuntary treatment  did not prevent him "from establishing by writ of habeas corpus the illegality of his detention". Some issues, such as whether an insanity defense can be withdrawn upon appeal, have not been settled.

Notes

External links

Mental health law in the United States
Forensic psychology
United States Court of Appeals for the Eighth Circuit cases
2004 in United States case law
History of Springfield, Missouri
United States habeas corpus case law